Tetrindole was a drug candidate that functions by reversibly inhibiting monoamine oxidase A; it was first synthesized in Moscow in the early 1990s. Tetrindole is similar in its chemical structure to pirlindole (Pyrazidol), and metralindole.

References 

Carbazoles
Reversible inhibitors of MAO-A
Abandoned drugs
Monoamine oxidase inhibitors
Russian drugs
Cyclohexyl compounds
Substances discovered in the 1990s